Geislingen may refer to two towns in Baden-Württemberg, Germany:
 Geislingen an der Steige, district of Göppingen
 Geislingen, Zollernalbkreis, Zollernalbkreis district